Dr. John Hughart House is a historic home located at Landisburg, Fayette County, West Virginia. It was built in 1917, and is constructed of wood and stone in the American Craftsman style.  It features a broad front porch with a long, segmental arch fascia with no center support.  Also on the property is a contributing spring house (1917) and garage / office (1917).

It was listed on the National Register of Historic Places in 2001.

References

Houses on the National Register of Historic Places in West Virginia
American Craftsman architecture in West Virginia
Houses completed in 1917
Houses in Fayette County, West Virginia
National Register of Historic Places in Fayette County, West Virginia